Hesperis matronalis is an herbaceous plant species in the family Brassicaceae. It has numerous common names, including  dame's rocket, damask-violet, dame's-violet, dames-wort, dame's gilliflower, night-scented gilliflower, queen's gilliflower, rogue's gilliflower, summer lilac, sweet rocket, mother-of-the-evening, Good & Plenties, and winter gilliflower.

These plants are biennials or short-lived perennials, native to Eurasia and cultivated in many other areas of the world for their attractive, spring-blooming flowers. In some of those areas, it has escaped from cultivation and become a weed species. The genus name Hesperis was probably given because the scent of the flowers becomes more conspicuous towards evening (Hespera is the Greek word for evening).

Description
Hesperis matronalis grows 100 cm or taller, with multiple upright, hairy stems. Typically, the first year of growth produces a mound of foliage, and flowering occurs the second year; the plants are normally biennials, but a number of races can be short-lived perennials. The plants have showy blooms in early to mid spring. The leaves are alternately arranged on upright stems and lanceolate-shaped; they typically have very short or lack petioles and have toothed margins, but sometimes are entire and are widest at the base. The foliage has short hairs on the top and bottom surfaces that give the leaves a somewhat rough feel. The larger leaves are around 12 cm long and over 4 cm wide. In early spring, a thick mound of low-growing foliage is produced; during flowering the lower parts of the stems are generally unbranched and denuded of foliage and the top of the blooming plant might have a few branches that end in inflorescences.

The plentiful, fragrant flowers are produced in large, showy, terminal racemes that can be 30+ cm tall and elongate as the flowers of the inflorescence bloom. When stems have both flowers and fruits, the weight sometimes causes the stems to bend. Each flower is large (2 cm across), with four petals. Flower coloration varies, with different shades of lavender and purple most common, but white, pink, and even some flowers with mixed colors exist in cultivated forms. A few different double-flowered varieties also exist.  The four petals are clawed and hairless. The flowers have six stamens in two groups, the four closest to the ovary are longer than the two oppositely positioned. Stigmas are two-lobed. The four sepals are erect and form a mock tube around the claws of the petals and are also colored similarly to the petals.

Some plants may bloom until August, but warm weather greatly shortens the duration on each flower's blooming. Seeds are produced in thin fruits 5–14 cm long pods, containing two rows of seeds separated by a dimple. The fruit are terete and open by way of glabrous valves, constricted between the seeds like a pea pod. Seeds are oblong, 3–4 mm long and 1–1.5 mm wide.

In North America, Hesperis matronalis is often confused with native Phlox species that also have similar large showy flower clusters.  They can be distinguished from each other by foliage and flower differences: dame's rocket has alternately arranged leaves and four petals per flower, while phloxes have opposite leaves and five petals.

Cultivation
Hesperis matronalis has been a cultivated species for a long time, and grows best in full sun to partial shade where soils are moist with good drainage. It is undemanding and self-seeds quickly, forming dense stands. Extensive monotypic stands of dame's rocket are visible from great distances; these dense collections of plants have the potential to crowd out native species when growing outside of cultivated areas.

The successful spread of dame's rocket in North America is attributed to its prolific seed production and because the seeds are often included in prepackaged "wildflower seed" mixes sold for "naturalizing". The plants typically produce a low-lying rosette of foliage the first year; in subsequent years, blooming and seed production occurs in tandem throughout the blooming season. This species is commonly found in roadside ditches, dumps and in open woodland settings, where it is noticed when in bloom. Although it makes an attractive, hardy garden plant, it has been found to be ecologically invasive in North America.

Hesperis matronalis is propagated by seeds, but desirable individuals, including the double-flowering forms, are propagated from cuttings or division of the clumps.

Young leaves are high in vitamin C and can be eaten in salads and have a slightly bitter taste. Seeds can be sprouted and also eaten in salads.

Distribution
A garden escape, H. matronalis is found in many areas of Ireland, including Belfast.

Dame's rocket was brought to North America in the 17th century and has since become naturalized there, now growing throughout most of the US and Canada. The US Department of Agriculture website has a map showing states and provinces in which the plant has been found.

In Europe, it is host to the caterpillars of several butterfly species, including the orange tip (Anthocharis cardamines), large white (Pieris brassicae), small white (Pieris rapae), and moths, such as Plutella porrectella.

Weediness

It is considered an invasive species in some areas. Five U.S. states have placed legal restrictions on it:
 In Colorado, it is classed as a noxious weed (B-list), with plans for eradication or management varying by area and year.
 In Connecticut, it is classified as invasive and banned, making it illegal to move, sell, purchase, transplant, cultivate, or distribute the plant.
 In Massachusetts, it is prohibited.
 In New York, it is classified as invasive and eradication considered infeasible.
 In Wisconsin, it is classed as restricted, i.e. an invasive species that is already widely established in the state, and causes, or has the potential to cause significant environmental or economic harm.

In Alberta, Canada, it is considered a noxious weed, meaning its growth or spread needs to be prevented.

References

External links

Brassicaceae
Garden plants
Plants described in 1753
Taxa named by Carl Linnaeus